Kielen Marcel Adams (born 11 May 2001) is an English semi-professional footballer who plays as a striker for Marine.

Early life
Adams was born in Huddersfield.

Career
After playing youth football for Oldham Athletic and Bradford City, Adams returned to Oldham in July 2019. In January 2020 he joined Chorley on loan. On 2 March 2020, he joined Hyde United on a one-month loan. He was released by Oldham at the end of the 2019–20 season.

On 4 September 2020, Adams signed for Clitheroe after playing for the club as a trialist. He extended his contract with the club in January 2021.

In August 2021, he signed for Macclesfield.

Adams joined Marine in March 2022, the first time since 1995 that the club had paid a transfer fee for a player. The undisclosed transfer fee was the highest that Macclesfield had received for a player.

Career statistics

Honours
Marine
Northern Premier League Division One West play-offs: 2021–22

References

External links
 

2001 births
Living people
English footballers
Association football forwards
Oldham Athletic A.F.C. players
Bradford City A.F.C. players
Chorley F.C. players
Hyde United F.C. players
Clitheroe F.C. players
Macclesfield F.C. players
Marine F.C. players
English Football League players
Northern Premier League players
North West Counties Football League players